Dae Gak (born 1947), born Robert Genthner, is a Zen master and the guiding teacher of Furnace Mountain in Clay City, Kentucky, a Korean Buddhist temple and retreat center co-founded in 1986 with Seung Sahn. He received Dharma transmission from Seung Sahn in 1994, and now teaches independently of Seung Sahn's Kwan Um School of Zen. In addition to Furnace Mountain he serves as guiding teacher for other Zen groups in North America, Germany and England. He also holds a Ph.D. in psychology and is currently a licensed psychologist in the state of Kentucky.

Biography

Robert Genthner (Buddhist name Dae Gak, "great enlightenment") was born in Springfield, Massachusetts in 1947. He went to graduate school in Psychology at Kent State University. Genthner graduated from Kent State in 1973 with his Ph.D. in clinical psychology, later that year teaching psychology at Eastern Kentucky University in Richmond, Kentucky. He stopped teaching in 1979, afterward practicing as a licensed psychologist.

In 1979, Genthner met Korean monk and Zen teacher Seung Sahn during a retreat at the Providence Zen Center. In the early 1980s, he and several other individuals founded the Lexington Zen Center in his home, with retreats sometimes taking place at the homes of other practitioners.  The group became affiliated with Seung Sahn's Kwan Um School of Zen, founded in July 1983. In 1986, he co-founded a Zen temple at Furnace Mountain with Seung Sahn. The temple, Kwan Se Um San Ji Sah (which means "Perceive World Sound High Ground Temple"), was completed in 1994. Also that year, Genthner/Dae Gak received Dharma transmission from Seung Sahn, and founded the Cincinnati Zen Center.

In 2000, Genthner was subject to disciplinary action following allegations by two patients of sexual misconduct and violations of patient confidentiality; while denying wrongdoing, he agreed to a suspension of one year, a fine, and one year of supervised probation after his license was reinstated. Also in 2000, he left the Kwan Um School of Zen and began his own. He has since established groups in North America, Germany and England. Genther, and the Furnace Mountain Zen Retreat Center was featured in the 2010 documentary film  Zen Furnace produced by Kentucky filmmaker Steven Middleton.

Gallery

Groups
Lexington Zen Center (Lexington, KY)
Cincinnati Zen Center (Cincinnati, OH)
Hamilton Zen Center (Hamilton, OH)
Dae Do Sah Zen Group (Rockville, MD)
South West Son Academy (Houston, TX)
Zen Island Fellowship (Galveston, TX)
Bristol Zen Centre (Bristol, UK)
Wilmington Zen (Wilmington, OH)

Affiliates
Mansfield Zen Center (Mansfield, OH)
Queensland Zen Centre (Queensland, AU)
Zen Society of Wooster (Wooster, OH)

Bibliography

See also
Furnace Mountain
Timeline of Zen Buddhism in the United States
Zen Master Seung Sahn

References

External links
Official site for Furnace Mountain
Kwan Um transmission speech

American International College alumni
Kent State University alumni
Kwan Um School of Zen
Zen Buddhism writers
Seon Buddhist monks
American Zen Buddhists
1947 births
Living people